Harold Thomas Finney II (May 4, 1956  – August 28, 2014) was an American software developer. In his early career, he was credited as lead developer on several console games. Finney later worked for PGP Corporation. He also was an early bitcoin contributor and received the first bitcoin transaction from bitcoin's creator Satoshi Nakamoto.

Early life and education 
Finney was born in Coalinga, California, on May 4, 1956, to Virginia and Harold Thomas Finney. His father was a petroleum engineer. Harold Finney II attended the California Institute of Technology, graduating with a BS in engineering in 1979.

Career 
After graduation from Caltech, he went to work in the computer gaming field for a company that developed video games such as Adventures of Tron, Armor Ambush, Astrosmash and Space Attack. He later went to work for the PGP Corporation with whom he remained until his retirement in 2011.

Finney was a noted cryptographic activist. During the early 1990s, in addition to being a regular poster on the cypherpunks listserv, Finney ran two anonymous remailers. Further cryptographic activism included running a (successful) contest to break the export-grade encryption Netscape used.

In 2004, Finney created the first reusable proof of work system before Bitcoin. In January 2009, Finney was the Bitcoin network's first transaction recipient.

Bitcoin
Finney was a cypherpunk and said:

He was an early Bitcoin user and on January 12, 2009, he received the first bitcoin transaction from Bitcoin's creator Satoshi Nakamoto. Finney lived in the same town for 10 years that Dorian Satoshi Nakamoto lived in (Temple City, California), adding to speculation that he may have been Bitcoin's creator. Finney denied that he was Satoshi Nakamoto.

In March 2013, Finney posted on a Bitcoin forum, BitcoinTalk, a publication called "Bitcoin and Me (Hal Finney)" where he states he was essentially paralyzed. He recalls finding out that Bitcoin had gained monetary value in late 2010, and mentions that despite amyotrophic lateral sclerosis (ALS) disease was causing his ability to code to be slower, he still loved programming and that it gave him goals. He continued to program until his death; he was working on experimental software called bcflick, which uses Trusted Computing to strengthen Bitcoin wallets.

During the last year of his life, the Finneys received anonymous calls demanding an extortion fee of 1,000 bitcoin. They became victims of swatting – a hoax "where the perpetrator calls up emergency dispatch using a spoofed telephone number and pretends to have committed a heinous crime in the hopes of provoking an armed police response to the victim's home". Extortionists have demanded fees of more bitcoins than Finney had left after using most of them to cover medical expenses in 2013.

Personal life
In October 2009, Finney announced in an essay on the blog Less Wrong that he had been diagnosed with amyotrophic lateral sclerosis (ALS) in August 2009, and wrote: "I hope to be able to read, browse the net, and even participate in conversations by email and messaging (...) I may even still be able to write code, and my dream is to contribute to open source software projects even from within an immobile body. That will be a life very much worth living." Prior to his illness, Finney had been an active runner. Finney and his wife raised money for ALS research with the Santa Barbara International Marathon.

Death 
Finney died in Phoenix, Arizona, on August 28, 2014, as a result of complications of ALS and was cryopreserved by the Alcor Life Extension Foundation.

References

External links
 
 
 Review: Vernor Vinge’s ‘Fast Times’ (review by Finney in Extropy)
 Hal Finney's profile in Forbes Magazine

People associated with Bitcoin
American transhumanists
California Institute of Technology alumni
Cypherpunks
Deaths from motor neuron disease
Neurological disease deaths in Arizona
1956 births
2014 deaths
Cryonically preserved people
People from Coalinga, California